The 3.7 cm SK C/30 was the German Kriegsmarine's primary  anti-aircraft gun during the Second World War. It was superseded by the fully automatic 3.7 cm FlaK 43 late in the war.

Description
The C/30 was a single-shot anti-aircraft gun that was loaded one round at a time which dropped its effective rate of fire to a mere 30 rounds per minute, far inferior to the 120 rounds per minute of its contemporary, the Bofors 40 mm anti-aircraft gun. Its muzzle velocity was on the other hand slightly superior (about 12-15% higher), which slightly eased the aiming. The SK C/30U gun was modified for use by submarines. All mountings were suitable for use against both air and soft surface targets.

Ship classes that carried the 3.7 cm SK C/30 include:

 Admiral Hipper-class cruisers
 Bismarck-class battleships
 Chamois-class minesweeping sloops
 Deutschland-class battleships
 Deutschland-class cruisers
 Elbing-class torpedo boats
 F-class escort ships
 German Type IXA submarines
 German Type XIV submarines
 Graf Zeppelin-class aircraft carriers
 Königsberg-class cruisers
 Leipzig-class cruisers
 M-class minesweepers
 PA-class patrol ships
 R boats
 Sperrbrecher
 Scharnhorst-class battleships
 Type 1934A-class destroyers
 Type 1936-class destroyers
 Type 1936A-class destroyers
 Type 1936B destroyers
 Type 35 torpedo boats
 Type 37 torpedo boats

Mountings

The Doppellafette C/30 (Dopp L C/30) was a twin mount with each gun in a separate cradle. It had a six-man crew on the mount itself plus additional ammunition handlers. The mounting was manually traversed and elevated and was gyro-stabilized up to a limit of 19.5° degrees to counteract the roll and pitch of the ship. Most German ships, fleet torpedo boat or larger, carried at least one Dopp L C/30 mounting. The Einheitslafette C/34 (Einh L C/34, universal mounting model 34) was a single gun mounted on a pedestal with a two-man crew. Some mounts were fitted with a  gun shield. It was used on the smaller Kriegsmarine ships like the Schnellboot. A number were used on land to supplement the anti-aircraft defenses of ports. The Ubts L C/39 submarine mount used the SK C/30U gun. It was a simple pedestal mount with a two-man crew, one of whom trained the gun with the shoulder stirrup; the other used gears to elevate the gun.

Ammunition
The SK C/30 used two types of tracer rounds. The 3.7 cm Br Sprgr Patr 40 L/4.1 Lh 37M was a high-explosive round with an incendiary filling while the 3.7 cm Sprgr Patr 40 L/4.1 Lh 37 lacked the incendiary fill, but was otherwise identical. Tracers were available in red, yellow or white and were marked on the shell by a painted band of the appropriate color.

Comparison of anti-aircraft guns

Footnotes

Citations

References

External links

 SK C/30 on navweaps.com

37 mm artillery
Naval anti-aircraft guns
Anti-aircraft guns of Germany
World War II anti-aircraft guns
World War II artillery of Germany
Naval guns of Germany
Rheinmetall
Military equipment introduced in the 1930s